The Münster tramway network once formed part of the public transport system in Münster, now in the federal state of North Rhine-Westphalia, Germany. Opened in 1901, the network lasted until 1954.

See also
List of town tramway systems in Germany
Trams in Germany

References

External links

History of Münster
Munster
Transport in North Rhine-Westphalia
Metre gauge railways in Germany
Münster